Paul D. Ralston  is a former Democratic member of the Vermont House of Representatives, representing Vermont House of Representatives Addison—1 District from 2010 to 2015.  Ralston did not seek re-election in 2014.

Biography

Ralston studied agricultural engineering at the University of Vermont and earned a B.S. in business administration from Trinity College.

He is a small business owner, and has owned Vermont Coffee Company since 2001. The company's organic, fair-trade coffee beans are sold to accounts ranging from small, highly regarded New York City coffee shops to Costco. Ralston, who is the sole owner, has not publicized sales figures but Vermont Coffee Company projects 20 percent growth in 2014.

He is also the founder and CEO of Vermont Sweet Maple.

He previously worked as a Marketing General Manager for the Body Shop in England, and the Marketing Manager and President of Autumn Harp.

He has served on the boards of Vermont Public Interest Research Group (VPIRG), Vermont Businesses for Social Responsibility (VBSR, President), Vermont Family Forests, Addison County Democrats (Treasurer), and Addison County Chamber of Commerce. He also runs a Vermont-based economic develop PAC, Vision to Action Vermont (V2AVT).

Committee assignments

2013-2014
At the beginning of the 2013 legislative session, Ralston served on the following committees:

Commerce and Economic Development

2011-2012
In the 2011-2012 legislative session, Ralston did not serve on any committees.

Elections

2012

Ralston won re-election in the 2012 election for Vermont House of Representatives—Addison 1. Ralston was unopposed in the August 28 Democratic primary and was unopposed in the general election, which took place on November 6, 2012.

2010

Ralston won election to the Vermont House of Representatives—Addison 1 in 2010.  Incumbent Steven Maier ran in the Democratic primary on August 24, 2010, but later withdrew from the race.  Ralston was selected to replace him on the ticket.  He was unopposed in the November 2, 2010 general election.

Endorsements
Ralston has received endorsements from numerous political, environmental, and development groups, including the Vermont Sierra Club, Planned Parenthood of Northern New England, Vermont League of Conservation Voters, and the Vermont State Employees' Association.

Voting record

2011-2012
The Ethan Allen Institute, a Vermont-based free-market public policy research and education organization, released its biennial publication, the Vermont Voters' Report Card, for the years 2011-2012. The report showed how Vermont legislators in the state House and state Senate voted on key issues important to the Institute. Here's how Ralston voted on the selected bills:

Noteworthy issues
May 1, 2013: Paul Ralston voted Nay (Passage With Amendment) - S 77 - Prohibits Liability for Self-Administered Lethal Dosages
February 2, 2013: Paul Ralston voted Yea (Passage) - H 265 - Amends Education Property Tax Rates for Fiscal Year 2014
May 4, 2012: Paul Ralston voted Yea (Conference Report Vote) - H 464 - Prohibits Hydraulic Fracturing
February 24, 2012: Paul Ralston did not vote - H 559 - Establishes a Health Benefit Exchange
May 6, 2011: Paul Ralston voted Yea (Conference Report Vote) - H 436 - Tax Law Amendments
May 5, 2011: Paul Ralston voted Yea (Passage With Amendment) - S 17 - Medical Marijuana
May 5, 2011: Paul Ralston voted Yea (Conference Report Vote) - H 202 - Single-Payer and Unified Health System
March 24, 2011: Paul Ralston voted Yea (Passage) - H 202 - Single-Payer and Unified Health System

Personal
Ralston is married. He is also the CEO and Co-founder of the Vermont Coffee Company.

See also 
Vermont State Legislature 
Vermont House of Representatives 
Vermont House Committees
Vermont Joint Committees
Vermont House of Representatives districts, 2002–12

References

External links
Profile from Open States
Biography from Project Vote Smart
Campaign contributions: 2010

 

1966 births
Living people
Democratic Party members of the Vermont House of Representatives
University of Vermont alumni